The Laureus Sport for Good Award is an award honouring the achievements of those who have demonstrated "tremendous contribution to sport or to society through sport". It was first awarded in 2000 as one of the inaugural awards presented during the Laureus World Sports Awards. The awards are presented by the Laureus Sport for Good Foundation, a global organisation involved in more than 150 charity projects supporting 500,000 young people. The first ceremony was held on 25 May 2000 in Monte Carlo, at which Nelson Mandela gave the keynote speech. The recipient is presented with a Laureus statuette, created by Cartier, at an annual awards ceremony held in various locations around the world. Although the Laureus Awards ceremony is held annually, the Sport for Good Award is not necessarily presented every time; it is one of a number of discretionary awards that can be given by the Laureus World Sports Academy.

The inaugural winner of the Laureus Sport for Good Award in 2000 was American Eunice Kennedy Shriver. The summer camp which she started in her back yard in 1962 became the Special Olympics and she was described by CNN's Emanuella Grinberg as "an advocate for the disenfranchised and a trailblazer for the rights of the disabled". The 2004 award was shared: Kenyan cricket organisation Mathare Youth Sports Association received it along with both the India and Pakistan national cricket teams. , one individual has been honoured posthumously. Peter Blake, the New Zealand yachtsman, was shot dead by pirates on the Amazon River in December 2001. Since its establishment, the award has not been awarded twice, in 2009 and 2013. It has been presented to organisations or individuals from Kenya and the United States on the most occasions, with three awards for each nation. The 2020 recipient of the Laureus Sport for Good Award was South Bronx United, "a project which used football to change the lives of young people and poor communities in New York."

Recipients

References

Sport for Good Award
Awards established in 2000